Saint-Gédéon was the name of both a former village municipality and a former parish municipality in the Chaudière-Appalaches region of Quebec.

On July 19, 1997, the village municipality of Saint-Gédéon became the municipality of Saint-Gédéon-de-Beauce.  On February 12, 2003, the parish municipality of Saint-Gédéon merged into Saint-Gédéon-de-Beauce.

References

Former municipalities in Quebec
Populated places disestablished in 2003